Matej Kosorín (born 3 April 1997) is a Slovak footballer who plays as a midfielder.

Club career

FK Senica
Kosorín made his professional Fortuna Liga's debut for FK Senica on 6 March 2015 against MFK Košice.

ASV Hohenau
In the summer 2019 it was confirmed, that Kosorín had joined Austrian club ASV Hohenau.

References

External links
 FK Senica profile
 
 Futbalnet profile
 Matej Kosorín at Footballdatabase

1997 births
Living people
Slovak footballers
Slovak expatriate footballers
Association football midfielders
FK Senica players
ŠKF Sereď players
AFC Nové Mesto nad Váhom players
MŠK Púchov players
Slovak Super Liga players
2. Liga (Slovakia) players
Slovak expatriate sportspeople in Austria
Expatriate footballers in Austria